Prime Blues is the fourth widely available studio album by American musician and computer scientist Jim Allchin. The release date of the album was September 21, 2018 by Sandy Key Music. The album contains 14 new contemporary blues songs. The front grill cover of the amplifier shown on the album artwork highlights all the prime numbers through one million.

Reception
Prime Blues reached the #1 Top Blues Album on the Roots Music Report which tracks American Roots Music radio airplay in 2018. It entered the RMR charts on October 6, 2018, charting in at #35. Since Oct 13, 2018, Prime Blues has remained in the top 10 Blues Albums according to RMR and as of January 12, 2019 was the #2 Blues album and #1 Contemporary Blues album. As of May 20, 2019, Prime Blues has been on the Roots Music Report chart for 33 weeks. Even though released in September 2018, Prime Blues finished as the 16th most played Contemporary Blues album for 2018 according to RMR.

Prime Blues was a Silver Medal Winner in the Global Music Awards in 2018.

"Two Bad Dreams" from the Prime Blues won second place in the International Songwriting Competition in the Blues category from over 19,000 entries.

"Give It Up" the first track from Prime Blues was a finalist in the 2018 UK Songwriting Contest in the Jazz/Blues category.

Prime Blues was first reviewed September 6, 2018 by Rick Bowen and published in the NorthWest Music Scene magazine.

Album reviews especially noted Allchin's songwriting, musicianship, and guitar technique.

Track listing

Personnel

Musicians
Jim Allchin – guitar, vocals, arrangements
Bob Britt - rhythm guitar
Kenny Greenberg – rhythm guitar
Tom Hambridge – drums, percussion
Kevin McKendree – keyboard
Rob McNelley – rhythm guitar
Glenn Worf – bass

Guest musicians
Bobby Rush – vocal and harmonica on "Two Bad Dreams"
Mycle Wastman – background vocals
Mike Zito - vocal on "Enough Is Enough"
The Memphis Horns - horns

Production
Tom Hambridge – produced
Ernesto Olvera-Lapier – tracking and mixing engineer engineering
Zach Allen - engineering (Bobby Rush vocal and Harmonica solo) engineering
Sean Badum (Studio D) – assistant engineer 
Jason Mott (Studio E) – assistant engineer
Evan Nickels – project assistant
Tommy MacDonald – project assistant
John Heithaus – project executive
The Switchyard - mixing and mastering

References

2018 albums
Jim Allchin albums